Guðjohnsen is an Icelandic family name. Notable people with the surname include:

Arnór Guðjohnsen (born 1961), Icelandic footballer
Eiður Guðjohnsen (born 1978), Icelandic footballer and coach
Sveinn Aron Guðjohnsen (born 1998), Icelandic footballer
Andri Guðjohnsen (born 2002), Icelandic footballer

Icelandic-language surnames